Louis Dupree (August 23, 1925 – March 21, 1989) was an American archaeologist, anthropologist, and scholar of Afghan culture and history. He was the husband of Nancy Hatch Dupree, who was the Board Director of the Afghanistan Center at Kabul University in Afghanistan and author of five books about Afghanistan. The husband and wife team from the United States worked together for 15 years in Kabul, collecting as many works written about Afghanistan as they could. They travelled across the country from 1962 until the 1979 Soviet intervention, conducting archaeological excavations.

Early life and careers 
Dupree was born on August 23, 1925, in Greenville, North Carolina. He left Greenville High School around 1943 without graduating to serve in World War II, where he joined the United States Merchant Marine and was stationed in the Philippines. At the end of the war he decided to transfer to the 11th Airborne Division of the United States Army. When World War II ended, he began Asian archeology and ethnology studies at Harvard University. After receiving his B.A., M.A., and Ph.D. degrees, he planned to re-visit the Philippines for research purposes but was rejected by its government, instead he was invited to join an archeological survey in Afghanistan in 1949. This led to his lifelong interest in southwestern Asia, from 1959 and 1983.

Dupree taught at the following universities:
 Air University at Maxwell Air Force Base
 Pennsylvania State University (Penn State)
 Princeton University in New Jersey
 United States Military Academy at West Point, New York
 University of North Carolina at Chapel Hill
 Duke University in Durham, North Carolina

During his career, Dupree also served as adviser to several governments, including those of West Germany, France, Denmark, Sweden, and Great Britain. He consulted with the United States Department of State and the United Nations. As an affiliate of the American Universities Field Staff (AUFS), he was their expert on Afghanistan and Pakistan.

He and his wife were often seen driving in a four-wheel-drive Land Rover truck in Afghan cities. After the April 1978 Saur Revolution in Afghanistan, Dupree was arrested and deported from the country. He moved back to the United States but often visited neighboring Pakistan to monitor the Soviet–Afghan War. He has worked with the mujahideen forces who were fighting the Soviet-backed government of Afghanistan. He spent time in Peshawar, Pakistan, along with his wife, assisting Afghan refugees. He had previously stayed in Pakistan as a Fulbright Scholar and as an advisor on Afghan affairs to the US ambassador in Pakistan.

Death 
Dupree died of lung cancer on March 21, 1989, at Duke University Hospital in Durham, North Carolina, just a month after the last Soviet troops withdrew from Afghanistan.

Books 
 Afghanistan (1973)
 An Historical Guide to Afghanistan (1972)
 An Historical Guide to Kabul
 A Guide to the National Museum

References

External links 

 Museum Under Siege: Full Text by Nancy Hatch Duprée
 ABLE in Afghanistan
 Embassy of Afghanistan Hosts Benefit for Afghanistan Center
 A Chronicler of Afghan Culture, Now Its Loyal Guard
 Preserving Afghanistan's Cultural Heritage: An Interview with Nancy Hatch Duprée
 Nancy Dupree's love affair with Kabul
 Groundbreaking ceremony for new library at Kabul University: 25 July 2009
 http://zeroanthropology.net/2012/07/31/the-goat-caught-in-bushkazi-personal-effects-of-ones-role-in-the-great-game/

American emigrants to Afghanistan
American expatriates in Pakistan
Harvard University alumni
Princeton University faculty
Duke University faculty
University of North Carolina at Chapel Hill faculty
1925 births
1989 deaths
Central Asian studies scholars
20th-century American archaeologists
Writers from Durham, North Carolina
20th-century American male writers
United States Army soldiers
People from Greenville, North Carolina
Historians of Afghanistan
20th-century American anthropologists
20th-century American historians
United States Merchant Mariners of World War II
Deaths from cancer in North Carolina
Deaths from lung cancer